The following is a list of islands in Isle Royale National Park. Located in Lake Superior, Isle Royale is the second largest island in the Great Lakes system, after only Manitoulin Island in Lake Huron. At , the island of Isle Royale itself is the third largest island in the contiguous United States (after Long Island and Padre Island) and is the fourth largest lake island in the world.

Isle Royale National Park consists of one large island (Isle Royale) surrounded by over 450 smaller islands, although approximately 110 of these islands are formally named.  While Isle Royale National Park contains no permanent population and is governed by the National Park Service, the area itself is part of Keweenaw County.  The northern half of the park is administered locally by Houghton Township, while the southern half is part of Eagle Harbor Township.

List of islands

See also
Isle Royale National Park
Lake Superior
List of islands of Michigan

Notes

References

External links
  Geographic Names Information System (GNIS) Domestic Names database search 
 Isle Royale National Park official website

Isle Royale

Isle Royale
Isle Royale
Isle Royale